William "Bubba" Paris (born October 6, 1960) is a former professional American football offensive tackle who played for the San Francisco 49ers of the NFL from 1983 to 1990 and for the Indianapolis Colts and Detroit Lions in 1991. He was a member of three 49ers teams that won the Super Bowl. He won the Len Eshmont Award in 1987, as selected by his teammates on the 49ers.

Paris went to DeSales High School in Louisville, Kentucky. He and his team didn't win state but many of the players were scouted. Now the team has multiple state championships.

Paris played college football at the University of Michigan, where he was named All-Big Ten, All-American and was also a (second-team) Academic All-American.

Paris currently works as a motivational speaker throughout the United States.  He resides in Tracy, California with wife Cynthia and son Trent. Paris has 2 sons, William III and Christian. In addition, he and his ex-wife Lynne have another 6 children:  Four sons, named Wayne, David, Austin and Brandon, and twin daughters, Courtney and Ashley, both of whom are former players in the WNBA.

See also
 Michigan Wolverines Football All-Americans

External links

Michigan Wolverines bio

1960 births
Living people
American football offensive tackles
Michigan Wolverines football players
San Francisco 49ers players
Indianapolis Colts players
Detroit Lions players
Players of American football from Louisville, Kentucky
African-American players of American football
21st-century African-American people
20th-century African-American sportspeople